The Friesian (also Frizian) is a horse breed originating in Friesland, in the Netherlands. Although the conformation of the breed resembles that of a light draught horse, Friesians are graceful and nimble for their size. It is believed that during the Middle Ages, ancestors of Friesian horses were in great demand as war horses throughout continental Europe. Through the Early Middle Ages and High Middle Ages, their size enabled them to carry a knight in armour. In the Late Middle Ages, heavier, draught type animals were needed. Though the breed nearly became extinct on more than one occasion, the modern day Friesian horse is growing in numbers and popularity, used both in harness and under saddle. Most recently, the breed is being introduced to the field of dressage, causing the decline of the draught-type with its sturdy legs and back.

Breed characteristics
The Friesian breed is most often recognised by its black coat colour. However, colour alone is not the only distinguishing characteristic; Friesians are occasionally chestnut as some bloodlines do carry the "red" ('e") gene. In the 1930s, chestnuts and bays were seen. Friesians rarely have white markings of any kind; most registries allow only a small star on the forehead for purebred registration.  To be accepted as breeding stock by the FPS studbook (Friesch Paarden Stamboek), a stallion must pass a rigorous approval process.

Horses are judged at an inspection, or keuring, by Dutch judges, who decide whether the horse is worthy of star designation. The breed has powerful overall conformation and good bone structure, with what is sometimes called a "Baroque" body type. Friesians have long, arched necks and well-chiseled, short-eared, "Spanish-type" heads. They have powerful, sloping shoulders, compact, muscular bodies with strong, sloping hindquarters and low-set tails. Their limbs are comparatively short and strong. A Friesian horse also has a long, thick mane and tail, often wavy, and "feather"—long, silky hair on the lower legs—deliberately left untrimmed. The breed is known for a brisk, high-stepping trot. The Friesian is considered willing, active, and energetic, but also gentle and docile. A Friesian tends to have great presence and to carry itself with elegance. Today, there are two distinct conformation types—the "baroque" type, which has the more robust build of the classical Friesian, and the modern, "sport horse" type, which is finer-boned. Both types are common, though the modern type is currently more popular in the show ring than is the baroque Friesian. However, conformation type is considered less important than correct movement.

The chestnut colour is generally not accepted for registration for stallions, though it is sometimes allowed for mares and geldings. A chestnut-coloured Friesian that competes is penalised. However, discoloration from old injuries or a black coat with fading from the sun is not penalised.  The chestnut allele, a recessive genetic trait in the Friesian, does exist; in the 1990s, two mares gave birth to chestnut foals. The Friesch Paarden Stamboek began to attempt breeding out the chestnut colour in 1990, and today stallions with genetic testing indicating the presence of the chestnut or "red" gene, even if heterozygous and masked by black colour, are not allowed registration with the FPS. The American Friesian Association, which is not affiliated to the KFPS, allows horses with white markings and/or chestnut colour to be registered if purebred parentage can be proven. In 2014 there were eight stallion lines known to still carry the chestnut gene.

There are four genetic disorders acknowledged by the industry that may affect horses of Friesian breeding: dwarfism, hydrocephalus, a tendency for aortic rupture, and megaesophagus.  There are genetic tests for the first two conditions.  The Friesian is also among several breeds that may develop equine polysaccharide storage myopathy.  Approximately 0.25% of Friesians are affected by dwarfism, which results in horses with a normal-sized head, a broader chest than normal, an abnormally long back and very short limbs. It is a recessive condition.  Additionally, the breed has a higher-than-usual rate of digestive system disorders, and a greater tendency to have insect bite hypersensitivity. Like some other draught breeds, they are prone to a skin condition called verrucous pastern dermatopathy and may be generally prone to having a compromised immune system.  Friesian mares have a very high 54% rate of retained placenta after foaling. Some normal-sized Friesians also have a propensity toward tendon and ligament laxity which may or may not be associated with dwarfism.  The relatively small gene pool and inbreeding are thought to be factors behind most of these disorders.

History
The Friesian originates in the province of Friesland in the northern Netherlands, where there is evidence of thousands of years of horse populations.

As far back in history as the 4th century there are mentions of Friesian troops which rode their own horses. One of the most well-known sources of this was by an English writer named Anthony Dent who wrote about the Friesian mounted troops in Carlisle. Dent, amongst others, wrote that the Friesian horse was the ancestor of both the British Shire, and the Fell pony. However, this is just speculation.
It was not until the 11th century, that there were illustrations of what appeared to be Friesans. Many of the illustrations found depict knights riding horses which resembled the breed, with one of the most famous examples being William the Conqueror.

These ancestors of the modern Friesians were used in medieval times to carry knights to battle. In the 12th and 13th centuries, some eastern horses of crusaders were mated with Friesian stock. During the 16th and 17th centuries, when the Netherlands were briefly linked with Spain, there was less demand for heavy war horses, as battle arms changed and became lighter. Andalusian horses were crossbred with Friesians, producing a lighter horse more suitable (in terms of less food intake and waste output) for work as urban carriage horses.

Historian Ann Hyland wrote of the Friesian breed:
The Emperor Charles (reigned 1516 -56) continued Spanish expansion into the Netherlands, which had its Frisian warhorse, noted by Vegetius and used on the continent and in Britain in Roman times. Like the Andalusian, the Frisian bred true to type. Even with infusions of Spanish blood during the sixteenth century, it retained its indigenous characteristics, taking the best from both breeds. The Frisian is mentioned in 16th and 17th century works as a courageous horse eminently suitable for war, lacking the volatility of some breeds or the phlegm of very heavy ones. Generally black, the Frisian was around 15hh with strong, cobby conformation, but with a deal more elegance and quality. The noted gait was a smooth trot coming from powerful quarters. Nowadays, though breed definition is retained, the size has markedly increased, as has that of most breeds due to improved rearing and dietary methods.

The breed was especially popular in the 18th and 19th centuries, when they were in demand not only as harness horses and for agricultural work, but also for the trotting races so popular then. The Friesian may have been used as foundation stock for such breeds as the Dole Gudbrandsdal, the Norfolk Trotter (ancestor of the Hackney), and the Morgan. In the 1800s, the Friesian was bred to be lighter and faster for trotting, but this led to what some owners and breeders regarded as inferior stock, so a movement to return to pureblood stock took place at the end of the 19th century. 

A studbook society was founded in 1879 by Frisian farmers and landowners who had gathered to found the Fries Rundvee Stamboek (FRS) The Paardenstamboek ("horse stud book") was published in 1880 and initially registered both Friesian horses and a group of heavy warmblood breeds, including Ostfriesen and Alt-Oldenburgers, collectively known as "Bovenlanders".  At the time, the Friesian horse was declining in numbers, and was being replaced by the more fashionable Bovenlanders, both directly, and by crossbreeding Bovenlander stallions on Friesian mares. This had already virtually exterminated the pure Friesian in significant parts of the province in 1879, which made the inclusion of Bovenlanders necessary. While the work of the society led to a revival of the breed in the late 19th century, it also resulted in the sale and disappearance of many of the best stallions from the breeding area, and Friesian horse populations dwindled.  By the early 20th century, the number of available breeding stallions was down to three. Therefore, in 1906, the two parts of the registry were joined, and the studbook was renamed the Friesch Paarden Stamboek (FPS) in 1907."

In 1913 a society, Het Friesch Paard, was founded to protect and promote the breed. By 1915 it had convinced FPS to split registration into two groups. By 1943, the breeders of non-Friesian horses left the FPS completely to form a separate association, which later became the Koninklijk Warmbloed Paardenstamboek Nederland (Royal Warmblood Studbook of the Netherlands (KWPN).

Displacement by petroleum-powered farm equipment on dairy farms also was a threat to the survival of Friesian horse. The last draught function performed by Friesians on a significant scale was on farms that raised dairy cattle. World War II slowed the process of displacement, allowing the population and popularity of the breed to rebound. Important in the initial stage of the recovery of the breed was due to the family owned Circus Strassburger, who, having fled Nazi Germany for the Low Countries, discovered the show qualities of the breed and demonstrated its abilities outside of its local breeding area during and after the Nazi occupation

Uses

As use in agricultural pursuits declined, the Friesian became popular for recreational uses. Today, about seven percent of the horses in the Netherlands are Friesians.

The Friesian horse today is used both in harness and under saddle, particularly in the discipline of dressage.  In harness, they are used for competitive and recreational driving, both singly and in teams.  A traditional carriage seen in some events designed for Friesian horses is a high-wheeled cart called a sjees. Friesians are also used in ventures such as pulling vintage carriages at assorted ceremonial events.

Because of their color and striking appearance, Friesian horses are a popular breed in movies and television, particularly in historic and fantasy dramas.  They are viewed as calm in the face of the activity associated with filmmaking, but also elegant on-camera.

See also
 Friesian cross

 Friesian Sporthorse

References

External links 

 Koninklijke Vereniging "Het Friesch Paarden-Stamboek" (KFPS)   Friesian stud-book association
Australia and New Zealand Friesian Horse Society  (ANZFHS) 

Conservation Priority Breeds of the Livestock Conservancy
Horse breeds
Horse breeds originating in the Netherlands
Culture of Friesland